Tropical Airways was a small airline with scheduled and charter services based in Port-au-Prince, Haiti.

Services
As of February 2005, Tropical Airways operated the following services:

Domestic scheduled destinations: Port-au-Prince to Cap-Haïtien, Jérémie and Port-de-Paix.
International scheduled destinations: Nassau, Bahamas and Providenciales, in the Turks and Caicos Islands

Accidents and incidents
On August 24, 2003, a Tropical Airways Let L-410 Turbolet commuter turboprop airliner en route from Cap-Haïtien to Port-de-Paix crashed in a sugar cane field. All 21 passengers died in the fiery crash. An official at Cap-Haïtien's airport said the 19-passenger aircraft departed with too many people aboard and too much baggage. Witnesses on the ground say they saw smoke billowing from the plane and luggage falling out of the aircraft's rear door.

Fleet
According to Flight International magazine, the Tropical Airways fleet as of August 2006 consisted of the following aircraft:
4 Let L-410 UVP

Earlier fleet information, from February 2005, identified just three planes in the fleet:
1 DHC Dash 8
1 Cessna Grand Caravan.
1 Shorts SD 360-300

References

External links
Tropical Airways Haiti
Route map
Data and fleet info 

Defunct airlines of Haiti
Airlines established in 1999
Airlines disestablished in 2003
Companies based in Port-au-Prince
1999 establishments in Haiti
2003 disestablishments in Haiti